National Route 230 is a national highway of Japan connecting Chūō-ku, Sapporo and Setana, Hokkaido in Japan, with a total length of 195.4 km (121.42 mi).

References

National highways in Japan
Roads in Hokkaido